Tact or TACT may refer to:
 The sense of touch – see somatosensory system
 Tact (psychology), a term used by B. F. Skinner for a type of verbal operant
 The Actors Company Theatre (TACT)
 Actors Orphanage, formerly The Actors' Charitable Trust (TACT)
 Tact Meyers, a Galaxy Angel character
 The Adolescent and Children's Trust
 Trial to Assess Chelation Therapy, an evaluation of chelation therapy for cardiovascular disease

See also
Tack (disambiguation)